Joshua Epstein may refer to:
 Joshua M. Epstein, professor of epidemiology
 Joshua Epstein (violinist), Israeli musician